Brigadier-general Frank Dutton Frost,  (17 January 1882 – 3 December 1968) was a British Army officer, who later joined the British Indian Army.

Biography
Frost served in South Africa during the Second Boer War, first as a trooper with the Royal Wiltshire Yeomanry contingent to the Imperial Yeomanry, and from November 1901 with the 3rd (Militia) Battalion of the Cheshire Regiment, where he was commissioned a second lieutenant. He was promoted to lieutenant on 31 May 1902, and left South Africa with the rest of the battalion in September 1902, after the end of the war. He received a regular commission in the Cheshire regiment in 1906.

Frost served during the First World War, on 21 September 1914 he transferred to the Supply & Transport Corps of the British Indian Army. On retirement from the Army in October 1930 with the rank of colonel and honorary brigadier-general, he then worked as a missionary in the North-West Frontier until 1945.

He married in 1912 Elsie Dora Bright.  Their son was John Dutton Frost, an officer who served in the Parachute Regiment during the Second World War. They also had two daughters. His wife died in 1952. In 1954 he married for a second time, Rhoda Collins, widow of Edward Collins, Kelvindale.

References 

British Army personnel of the Second Boer War
Commanders of the Order of the British Empire
Cheshire Regiment officers
British Indian Army officers
Indian Army personnel of World War I
Recipients of the Military Cross
1882 births
1968 deaths